Datuk Robert Lau Hoi Chiew (15 September 1942 – 9 April 2010) was a Malaysian politician.  He represented Sibu in the Parliament of Malaysia from 1990 until his death in 2010, and served as Deputy Minister of Transport from April 2009 until his death. Lau was also a vice-president of the Sarawak United Peoples' Party (SUPP).

Background
Lau was born to a poor family and his mother died when he was three years old. He was schooled at St Michael's College, Adelaide and studied accountancy at the South Australia Institute of Technology (now the University of South Australia). In Australia he met his wife, Kapitan Dato' Janet Lau Ung Hie. He had three children with his wife; Alvin Lau Lee Ren (eldest son), Tammy Lau Lee Teng (daughter) and Pierre Lau Lee Wui (son).

His political career began in 1983 when he joined SUPP. He first contested a Parliamentary election in the 1990 Malaysian general election, winning the seat of Sibu against a Democratic Action Party candidate by a majority of 2,008 votes. He defended the seat in four further elections.

Death
Lau died of bile duct cancer (cholangiocarcinoma) in his home in Kuala Lumpur on 9 April 2010. His remains arrived in Sibu at night on the same day. His funeral was held on 11 April 2010. The funeral began with a procession around the Sibu town and a requiem mass. His body was later buried at Nirvana Memorial Park.

Election results

Honours
  :
  Commander of the Order of the Star of Hornbill Sarawak (PGBK) – Datuk (2002)

References

1942 births
2010 deaths
People from Sarawak
21st-century Malaysian politicians
Deaths from cancer in Malaysia
Deaths from liver cancer
Malaysian Roman Catholics
Malaysian politicians of Chinese descent
Commanders of the Order of the Star of Hornbill Sarawak
Sarawak United Peoples' Party politicians
University of South Australia alumni
Members of the Dewan Rakyat